Gonzálo Camilli (born June 4, 1974 in Montevideo, Uruguay) is a former Uruguayan footballer who played for clubs of Uruguay, Argentina, Chile, Ecuador and El Salvador.

Teams
  Independiente 1992–1995
  Atlético Tucumán 1995–1996
  Santiago Wanderers 1997–1998
  Montevideo Wanderers 1998
  Águila 1999
  Técnico Universitario 2000
  Deportivo Saquisili 2001–2002
  Argentino de Quilmes 2002–2004

External links
 
 Profile at En una Baldosa 

1974 births
Living people
Uruguayan footballers
Uruguayan expatriate footballers
Club Atlético Independiente footballers
Atlético Tucumán footballers
Santiago Wanderers footballers
Montevideo Wanderers F.C. players
C.D. Águila footballers
Chilean Primera División players
Argentine Primera División players
Expatriate footballers in Chile
Expatriate footballers in Argentina
Expatriate footballers in Ecuador
Expatriate footballers in El Salvador
Association football forwards